San Esteban del Valle is a municipality located in the province of Ávila, Castile and León, Spain. According to the 2006 census (INE), the municipality has a population of 890 inhabitants.

References

External links
sanestebandelvalle.com

Municipalities in the Province of Ávila